St. Angelariy Peak is the rocky, partly ice-free peak rising to 980 m in Metlichina Ridge on Oscar II Coast, Graham Land in Antarctica.  It is overlooking Punchbowl Glacier to the north and east, and Minzuhar Glacier to the southwest.

The feature is named after the Bulgarian scholar Saint Angelar (9th century AD), a disciple of Saints Cyril and Methodius.

Location
British mapping in 1974.

Maps
 Antarctic Digital Database (ADD). Scale 1:250000 topographic map of Antarctica. Scientific Committee on Antarctic Research (SCAR), 1993–2016.

References

 St. Angelariy Peak. SCAR Composite Antarctic Gazetteer.
 Bulgarian Antarctic Gazetteer. Antarctic Place-names Commission. (details in Bulgarian, basic data in English)

External links
 St. Angelariy Peak. Copernix satellite image

Mountains of Graham Land
Oscar II Coast
Bulgaria and the Antarctic